Bison is an unincorporated community and census-designated place (CDP) located on US Highway 81 in Garfield County, Oklahoma, United States, consisting of a  town plat. As of the 2010 census, it had a population of 65.

The community was named for nearby Buffalo Springs, a historic stagecoach stop and a watering hole on the Chisholm Trail located about a mile north of Bison. Bison is home to a Catholic community, part of St. Joseph's parish under the Archdiocese of Oklahoma City. The church was erected in 1909, followed by a two-story brick school building operated by the Sisters of the Divine Providence from 1911 to 1934, when the Adorers of the Blood of Christ took over.

Bison's economy is agricultural and oil-based with oil wells on several farms and grain elevators by the Bison Cooperative Association, Star Mill and Burrus Mill companies. Bison was home to Bison State Bank from 1900 until 1933, when it closed due to the Great Depression. The Hotel Woodring was established in 1900 by Irvin and Ella Woodring, the parents of Irvin "Bertie" Woodring, for whom Enid Woodring Regional Airport is named. The post office opened on August 31, 1901. The Bison Mercantile Company was originally established as a grocery store by W.J. Scrichfield in 1900 and operated until 1958 when it was purchased by the Bison Cooperative Association. The co-op was established in 1920, the same year that Oklahoma Gas & Electric brought electricity to the town.

Geography
Bison is located in southern Garfield County on the west side of US Highway 81, which leads north  to Enid, the county seat, and south  to Hennessey.

Climate

Demographics

Education
Its school district is Waukomis Public Schools.

References

Census-designated places in Garfield County, Oklahoma
Census-designated places in Oklahoma